Ernest Albert Bailes (18 June 1888 – 16 March 1964) was an Australian rules footballer. He played with Collingwood in the Victorian Football League (VFL); and, having been dropped by Collingwood, he transferred mid-season to the Brighton Football Club in the VFA, where he played from 1909 to 1915.

Family 
Born on 9 August, 1883,  the son of Alfred Shrapnell Bailes, who was the Mayor of Sandhurst, (1883-1884), and member of the Victorian Legislative Assembly (1896-1894, 1897-1907), and the younger brother of ex-Fitzroy footballer Barclay "Tich" Bailes.

Military service 
He enlisted in the First AIF in February 1916.

Notes

External links 

		
Ernie Bailes's profile at Collingwood Forever

1888 births
1964 deaths
Australian rules footballers from Bendigo
Collingwood Football Club players
Australian military personnel of World War I
Military personnel from Victoria (Australia)
Australian people of English descent
Brighton Football Club players